The Georgia Association of Educators is a 501(c)(6) non-profit professional association and advocacy group of public school educators in Georgia. It was established in 1970 when the Georgia Teachers and Education Association, which was black-only at the time (established in 1933 by Joseph Winthrop Holley), merged with the all-white Georgia Education Association. It is a state affiliate of the National Education Association. Its members include teachers, school administrators, and professionals working in other roles in Georgia public schools. As of 2018, the organization had about 30,000 members.

References

External links

1970 establishments in Georgia (U.S. state)
Teacher associations based in the United States
Non-profit organizations based in Georgia (U.S. state)
Professional associations based in the United States
Trade unions established in 1970
Educational organizations based in Georgia (U.S. state)
501(c)(6) nonprofit organizations
Tucker, Georgia